Siddhidhatri is the ninth and final among the Navadurga (nine forms) aspects of the Hindu mother goddess Mahadevi. The meaning of her name is as follows: Siddhi means supernatural power or meditative ability, and Dhatri means giver or awarder. She is worshipped on the ninth day of Navaratri (nine nights of Navadurga); she fulfills all the divine aspirations. It is believed that one side of Lord Shiva’s body is that of Goddess Siddhidatri. Therefore, he is also known by the name of Ardhanarishwara. According to Vedic scriptures, Lord Shiva attained all the siddhis by worshiping this Goddess.

Iconography 
The goddess is depicted with four hands holding a chakra(discus), shankh(conch shell), mace, and lotus. She is seated on either a fully bloomed lotus or a lion as her mount. In some pictorial depictions, she is flanked by Gandharvas, Yakshas, Siddhas, Asuras and Devas who are portrayed as paying obeisance to the goddess.

Legend 
Around the time when the universe was just a massive void completely full of darkness, there were no indications of the world anywhere. But then a ray of divine light, which is ever existing, spread everywhere, illuminating each and every nook of the void. This sea of light was formless. Suddenly, it started taking a definite size, and finally looked like a Divine Lady, who was none other than Goddess Mahashakti herself. The Supreme Goddess came forth and gave birth to the Trinity of Gods, Brahma, Vishnu and Shiva. She advised the three Lords to contemplate to understand their roles of performing their duties for the world. Acting on the words of Goddess Mahashakti, The Trimurti sat by the bank of an ocean and performed penances for many years. The pleased Goddess appeared before them in the form of Siddhidhatri. She bestowed upon them their wives, She created Lakshmi, Saraswati and Parvati  gave them to Vishnu, Brahma and Shiva respectively. Goddess Siddhidhatri entrusted Brahma to take up the role as the creator of worlds, Vishnu with the role of preserving the creation and its creatures, and Shiva with the role of destroying the worlds when it is time. She tells them that their powers are in the forms of their respective wives, who will help them perform their tasks. The Goddess assured them that she will also provide to them, divine miraculous powers, which will also help them carry out their duties. Saying this, she bestowed to them eight supernatural powers, in which they were named Anima, Mahima, Garima, Laghima, Prapti, Prakambya, Ishitva and Vashitva. Anima means reducing one's body to the size of a crumb, Mahima means expanding one's body to an infinitely large size, Garima means becoming infinitely heavy, Laghima means becoming weightless, Prapti means having omnipresence, Prakambya means achieving whatever one desires, Ishitva means possessing absolute lordship, and Vashitva means having the power to subjugate all. Apart from the eight supreme siddhis that goddess Siddhidatri had granted Trimurti, she is believed to have granted to them, nine treasures and ten other kinds of supernatural powers or potentialities. The two parts, man and woman, created Devas and Devis, Daityas, Danavas, Asuras, Gandharvas, Yakshas, Apsaras, Bhutas, Heavenly beings, Mythical Creatures, Plants, Aquatic, Terrestrial and Aerial animals, Nagas and Garudas, etc and many more species of the world were born and thus originated from them. The creation of the entire world was now fully complete, full of innumerable stars, galaxies as well as constellations. The solar system was complete with the nine planets. On Earth, firm landmass was created, surrounded by such vast oceans, lakes, streams, rivers and other bodies of water. All types of flora and fauna had originated and were given their proper habitations. The 14 worlds were created and constructed altogether, giving the above-mentioned creatures places of residences to stay in, as to which they all called home.

In this form Durga is seated on a lotus and is four-armed. She holds a lotus, mace, Chakra and shankha. In this form Durga removes ignorance and she provides the knowledge to realize that or Brahman. She is surrounded by Siddhas, Gandharvas, Yakshas, Devas (Gods) and Asura (Demons) worship her. The Siddhi that she provides is the realization that only she exists. She is the mistress of all achievements and perfections.

Symbolism 
Siddhidhatri is the moola roopa or primordial form of goddess Parvati. She possesses eight supernatural powers, or the siddhis, called Anima, Mahima, Garima, Laghima, Prapti, Prakambya, Ishitva and Vashitva. Anima means reducing one's body to the size of an atom; Mahima means expanding one's body to an infinitely large size; Garima means becoming infinitely heavy; Laghima means becoming weightless; Prapti means having omnipresence; Prakambya achieving whatever one desire; Ishitva means possessing absolute lordship; and Vashitva means having the power to subjugate all. Lord Shiva was blessed by Siddhidatri by being given by all the eight powers.

References

Dictionary of Hindu Lore and Legend by Anna Dhallapiccola

Hindu goddesses